M&T Bank Corporation (Manufacturers and Traders Trust Company) is an American bank holding company headquartered in Buffalo, New York. It operates 1,000+ branches in 12 states across the Eastern United States, from Maine to Southern Virginia. Until May 1998, the bank's holding company was named First Empire State Corporation.

M&T Bank has been profitable in every quarter since 1976. Other than Northern Trust, M&T was the only bank in the S&P 500 Index not to lower its dividend during the financial crisis of 2007–2008.

The bank owns the Buffalo Savings Bank building in downtown Buffalo, Bridgeport Center in Bridgeport, Connecticut, and the M&T Tech Hub in the Seneca One Tower. It also sponsors M&T Bank Stadium, home of the Baltimore Ravens, as well as the University of Buffalo (M&T Bank Auditorium, M&T Bank Atrium). M&T Bank is the official bank of the Buffalo Bills in Western New York and of their home Bills Stadium in Orchard Park, New York. Wilmington Trust is a subsidiary of M&T Bank Corporation, offering global corporate and institutional services, private banking, investment management, and fiduciary services.

History

19th century
In the mid-19th century, few banking options existed for the growing number of manufacturers in the city of Buffalo. As a result, businessmen Pascal Pratt and Bronson Rumsey founded M&T Bank in 1856 as "Manufacturers and Traders Trust Company". Henry Martin, former president of the Attica and Buffalo Railroad, is appointed the first president and assigned a salary of $1,000 a year. The company opened its first office on August 29 of that year at 2 East Swan Street in Buffalo. In 1885, Martin retired as president, at the age of 83, and was succeeded by Pascal Pratt, who had served as Vice President since the bank was formed.

20th century
In 1901, the bank built a new headquarters on a site purchased for $210,000 near the southwest corner of Main and Swan Streets in Buffalo. The granite neo-classical building was designed by architect E. B. Green of Green & Wicks. By 1914, Robert Livingston Fryer was the bank's President. In 1917, Harry T. Ramsdell, the bank's fourth president, served as a district chairman for a special subscription committee of the national Liberty Loan program.
 
Following the 1925 merger with Fidelity Trust, the $100 million company was headed by Fidelity's President, 36-year-old Lewis G. Harriman. Harriman and a group of investors including A. H. Schoellkopf, from the founding family of the Niagara Mohawk power company, and James V. Forrestal, who would become the first U.S. Secretary of Defense, own enough shares to control both Fidelity and M&T.

In 1961, M&T acquired an entire block on Main Street between North Division and Eagle Streets in downtown Buffalo and began plans for a $12 million skyscraper to become the bank's new headquarters. In 1963, architect Minoru Yamasaki, who was featured on the cover of Time magazine that year as he was designing the World Trade Center in New York City, was retained by M&T to design its new building in Buffalo, which was completed in 1967. In 1964, Charles W. Millard succeeded Harriman as chairman of M&T.

In 1969, M&T's stockholders voted to create a multi-bank holding company known as First Empire State Corporation. In 1983, the bank which had assets of $2 billion and operated 60 offices, named Robert G. Wilmers as chairman and CEO, a position he held until his death in December 2017. In 1995, First Empire formed a national bank subsidiary, M&T Bank, N.A.

21st century
In 2008, M&T received a $600 million investment by the United States Treasury as a result of the Troubled Asset Relief Program (TARP) and M&T assumed another $482 million in TARP obligations from its acquisitions. In 2011, the bank repaid $700 million of TARP funds.

On December 16, 2017, Robert Wilmers died and non-executive chairman Robert T. Brady became acting chairman and CEO. On December 20, 2017, René F. Jones was appointed chairman and CEO.

In May 2022, M&T announced a $25 million initiative to support lower-income communities and underrepresented groups. The new Amplify Fund will be deployed over 3 years with most of the funds set to be distributed to Connecticut-based organizations and other north-eastern states where People’s United had operated. M&T announced that $9-$11 million will be distributed by the end of 2022, with the rest of the funds to be distributed over the next two year and expects to fund approximately 60-70 organizations in the initiatives first phase.

In October 2022, M&T launched its Multicultural Banking Center in East Hartford, Connecticut; the bank has 118 multicultural locations.

Mergers and acquisitions
Between 1945 and 1966, M&T acquired 18 local banking institutions. Between 1987 and 2022, M&T Bank acquired 24 financial institutions, as follows:

1920s
 December 1925: merged with Fidelity Trust Company under the name Manufacturers and Traders Trust Company
 May 1927: acquired the People's Bank of Buffalo

1940s
 June 1945: acquired the First National Bank of Kenmore 
 October 1945: acquired the Citizens National Bank of Lancaster
 December 1945: acquired the American Bank of Lackawanna

1980s
 December 1987: acquired East New York Savings, which operated 15 branches in metropolitan New York City

1990s
 January 1990: acquired $486 million in deposits and 11 offices in Rochester from Monroe Savings Bank of Rochester, New York
 September 1990: acquired $1.3 billion in deposits and 13 offices (9 in Buffalo and 4 in Rochester) of Empire of America Savings Bank of Buffalo
 May 1991: acquired $2.1 billion in deposits and 14 branches of Goldome Bank of Buffalo
 July 1992: acquired $1.1 billion asset Central Trust of Rochester, New York and the $300 million asset Endicott Trust of Binghamton, New York. 
 December 1994: acquired $146 million in deposits from the Hudson Valley branches of Chemical Bank; and $470 million in assets and $339 million in deposits Ithaca Bancorp of Ithaca, New York.
 July 1995: Hudson Valley branches of Chase Manhattan
 January 1997: Green Point Bank branches of Westchester, New York
 June 1999: First National Bank of Rochester 
 April 1998: OnBank of Syracuse, New York
 September 1999: 29 Chase Bank Branches in Buffalo, Jamestown, and Binghamton

2000s
 October 2000: Keystone Financial of Central Pennsylvania
 February 2001: Premier Nation Bancorp of Newburgh
 April 2003: Allfirst Bank of Baltimore, a subsidiary of Allied Irish Banks of Ireland, in exchange for 26.7 million shares of M&T and $886 million in cash. At the direction of Irish government financial regulators, AIB sold its 22% ownership interest in M&T in 2010.
 June 2006: 21 Citibank branches in Buffalo and Rochester
 December 2007: Partners Trust Financial Group, including 33 branches in upstate New York, for $555 million.
 December 2007: 12 First Horizon National Corporation branches in the greater Washington D.C. and Baltimore markets.
 May 2009: Provident Bank of Maryland in a stock transaction.
 August 2009: The Federal Deposit Insurance Corporation (FDIC) seized Bradford Bank and sold all its deposits and most assets to M&T. M&T and the FDIC agreed to share future losses on $338 million worth of Bradford's assets.

2010s
 November 2010: K Bank of Baltimore, Maryland
 May 2011: acquired Wilmington Trust for $351 million in stock.
 August 2012: M&T announced the acquisition of Hudson City Bancorp for $3.7 billion. The bank had $25 billion in deposits and $28 billion in loans and 135 brick-and-mortar branch locations including 97 in New Jersey. The acquisition was delayed for 3 years due to a money laundering case involving an M&T branch and the acquisition closed on November 2, 2015.
November 2015: Hudson City Bancorp for $3.7 billion

2020s
April 2022: acquired People's United Bank in an all-stock transaction valued at approximately $8.3 billion.  The acquisition was completed on April 2, 2022.

Legal issues

Money laundering
In June 2014, a U.S. District Judge ordered M&T Bank to forfeit $560,000 in drug proceeds that had been laundered through its Perry Hall, Maryland, branch. At least 8 times from 2011 to 2013, Deanna Bailey, a drug dealer, went to the branch and had head teller Sabrina Fitts convert cash amounts from $20,000 to $100,000 into larger bills. Fitts accepted a 1% transaction fee in exchange for not filing a currency transaction report. This violated the Bank Secrecy Act of 1970 which requires all cash transactions of more than $10,000 to be reported to the Internal Revenue Service.

The acquisition of Hudson City Bancorp was delayed for more than 3 years by the Federal Reserve Board, which was unconvinced that the bank's anti-laundering controls were strong enough.

References

External links

Banks based in New York (state)
Companies based in Buffalo, New York
American companies established in 1856
Banks established in 1856
Companies listed on the New York Stock Exchange